Mohan Bhagwat  (Marathi pronunciation: [moːɦən bʱaːɡʋət̪]; born 11 September 1950) is an activist currently serving as the 6th and current Sarsanghchalak of the Rashtriya Swayamsevak Sangh in India. He was chosen as the successor to K. S. Sudarshan in March 2009.

Early life
Mohan Madhukar Bhagwat was born in a Marathi Karhade Brahmin family in Chandrapur, then Bombay State of India. He comes from a family of RSS activists. His father Madhukar Rao Bhagwat, was the Karyavah (secretary) for the Chandrapur zone and later a Prant Pracharak (provincial promoter) for Gujarat. His mother Malati was a member of the RSS Women's Wing.

Bhagwat completed his schooling from 'Lokmanya Tilak Vidyalaya' and then the first year of his BSc from the Janata College in Chandrapur. He graduated in Veterinary Sciences and Animal Husbandry from Government Veterinary College, Nagpur. He dropped out of his postgraduate course in Veterinary Sciences and became a pracharak (full-time promoter/worker) of the RSS towards the end of 1975.

Association with RSS
After working underground during the Emergency, Bhagwat became the 'Pracharak' of Akola in Maharashtra in 1977 and rose within the organisation responsible for Nagpur and Vidarbha regions.

He became 'Akhil Bharatiya Sharirik Pramukh', (in-charge of physical training) for India, 1991 to 1999. He was further promoted as 'Akhil Bharatiya Pracharak Pramukh,' (in-charge of RSS volunteers working full-time for India).

In 2000, when Rajendra Singh and  decided to step down as RSS Chief and general secretary respectively due to poor health, K. S. Sudarshan was nominated as the new chief and Bhagwat became 'Sarkaryavah,' (general secretary).

Bhagwat was chosen as the Sarsanghchalak (Chief Executive) of the RSS on 21 March 2009. He is one of the youngest leaders to head the Rashtriya Swayamsevak Sangh after K. B. Hedgewar and M. S. Golwalkar.

In June 2015, due to a high threat perception from various Islamist terrorist organisations, the government of India ordered the Central Industrial Security Force (CISF) to provide Bhagwat with round-the-clock protection. At Z+ VVIP security cover, Bhagwat is one of the most protected Indians today.
	
In 2017, Bhagwat became the first RSS Chief to be officially invited to the Rashtrapati Bhawan by then President Pranab Mukherjee. In September 2018, Mohan Bhagwat presided over a 3-day session at Vigyan Bhawan in Delhi as part of reaching out to wider public. That time, he said that RSS has discarded some parts of M. S. Golwalkar’s "Bunch of Thoughts" which are no longer relevant to the current circumstances.

Opinion
In November 2016, while addressing a 'Prerna Shibir' on the 80th anniversary of Rashtra Sevika Samiti, the women's wing of the RSS, Mohan Bhagwat said that Homo sapiens ate into the space of other species of genus Homo, like Homo floresiensis and Neanderthals, in the past, but even Homo sapiens could go extinct in the next thousand years.

Bhagwat was quoted in September 2017 for saying "Hinduism was the only true religion in the world and other religions were just sects which emerged from Hinduism."

In November 2021, Mohan Bhagwat expressed opposition to the partition of India and advocacy for Indian reunification, declaring "The only solution to the pain of Partition lies in undoing it."

In October 2022, during a speech on the occasion of Vijayadashami, Bhagwat stressed on the need for family planning, and imbalance in population across the country. He urged the government to bring in suitable reforms on the same issue. 

In January 2023, Bhagwat advocated support towards the LGBT community in India. He stated that "People with such proclivities have always been there; for as long as humans have existed... This is biological, a mode of life"

Awards and recognition
In 2017, the state-run Animal and Fishery Sciences University awarded Mohan Bhagwat with an honorary doctor of science (DSc) degree during its convocation ceremony in Nagpur.

Further reading 

 Yashaswi Bharat. Prabhat Prakashan, 2021, (with a preface by M.G. Vaidya).
 Rashtriya Swayamsevak Sangh chief Mohan Bhagwat launched a mobile app developed to make more accessible works of "national" thinkers called Audio Kumbh.

Reference

External links 

Living people
1950 births
Rashtriya Swayamsevak Sangh pracharaks
Activists from Maharashtra
Sarsanghchalaks
Indian Hindus
People from Chandrapur
Hindu revivalists
Indian Hindu religious leaders